Georgia and the Republic of Kiribati established diplomatic relations in 2012.

Relations 
Georgia and Kiribati established their bilateral relations on 28 September 2012 at a time when Georgia sought closer relations with Pacific states to counter Russia's presence in the region. The establishment of the bilateral ties came about a year following Georgian Prime Minister Nika Gilauri's visit to New Zealand where, according to Moscow, he pressed the Wellington government to put pressure on Kiribati to side with Georgia in the Russo-Georgian conflict.

While their ties have been limited, Kiribati's President Anote Tong met with Georgian Foreign Affairs Minister Maia Panjikidze in September 2013 on the sidelines of the UN General Assembly.

Kiribati has been a steadfast supporter of Georgia's territorial integrity since then, despite Russia's attempts to lobby Pacific states like Nauru, Tuvalu and Vanuatu to recognize the independence of Abkhazia and South Ossetia. In 2018, Kiribati was one of the nations to vote in favor of the Georgia-sponsored UN resolutions calling for the return of internally displaced persons from Abkhazia and South Ossetia.

Diplomatic Mission 
Georgia is represented in Kiribati via its embassy in Canberra, Australia. The current ambassador is Giorgi Dolidze, who has served since 2017.

Agreement 
The governments of Georgia and Kiribati have signed one bilateral agreement:
 The Memorandum of Understanding on Cooperation between the Ministry of Foreign Affairs of Georgia and Ministry of Foreign Affairs of the Republic of Kiribati (September 2013)

Visa Regime 
Citizens of Kiribati and Georgia do not enjoy a visa-free regime. Both require a tourist visa upon entry that can last up to 30 days.

See also 
 Foreign relations of Georgia
 Foreign relations of Kiribati

References 

 
Kiribati
Georgia